St Mary's Church, Norton Cuckney is a Grade I listed parish church in the Church of England in Cuckney.

At the edge of the churchyard are the remains of Cuckney Castle, a motte and bailey castle listed as a Scheduled Monument by the Department for Digital, Culture, Media and Sport.

History

The church dates from the 12th century, and was restored in 1667, 1892 and 1907.

It is in a joint parish with 
St Winifred's Church, Holbeck
Welbeck College Chapel

Memorials

In the nave floor is a worn slab of black marble, reputed to be the tomb of Robert Pierrepont, 1st Earl of Kingston-upon-Hull, c.1643.

Organ

The church contains a pipe organ by Brindley & Foster dating from 1877.  A specification of the organ can be found on the National Pipe Organ Register.

Gallery

References

Church of England church buildings in Nottinghamshire
Grade I listed churches in Nottinghamshire